Le Chesnay-Rocquencourt is a commune in the western suburbs of Paris, in the department of Yvelines.

It was established on 1 January 2019 from the amalgamation of the communes of Le Chesnay and Rocquencourt.

Population

References

External links

Communes of Yvelines
Communes nouvelles of Yvelines
Populated places established in 2019
2019 establishments in France